Hurricane Smith may refer to:

Norman Smith (record producer) (1923–2008), English recording engineer and producer who worked with the Beatles, aka Hurricane Smith
Hurricane Smith (1941 film), American western 
Hurricane Smith (1952 film), American action/adventure feature
Hurricane Smith (1992 film), Australian-American action/adventure feature